CHXL-FM is a community radio station that operates at 95.3 FM in Okanese Indian Reserve, Saskatchewan, Canada. CHXL is owned by O.K. Creek Radio Station Inc.

On April 17, 2002, the station was given approval by the Canadian Radio-television and Telecommunications Commission (CRTC) to operate a community radio station at Okanese Indian Reserve.

Notes
The CHXL-FM call sign was formerly used by CJPT-FM in Brockville, Ontario from 1998 to 2001.

References

External links
 

HXL
Radio stations established in 2002
2002 establishments in Saskatchewan